Great Zimbabwe is a medieval city in the south-eastern hills of the modern country of Zimbabwe, near Lake Mutirikwi and the town of Masvingo. It is thought to have been the capital of a great kingdom during the Late Iron Age, about which little is known. Construction on the city began in the 9th century and continued until it was abandoned in the 15th century. The edifices are believed to have been erected by the ancestral Shona. It is recognised as a World Heritage Site by UNESCO.

Great Zimbabwe is believed to have served as a royal palace for the local monarch. As such, it would have been used as the seat of political power. Among the edifice's most prominent features were its walls, some of which are eleven metres high. They were constructed without mortar (dry stone). Eventually, the city was abandoned and fell into ruin.

The earliest document mentioning the Great Zimbabwe ruins was in 1531 by Vicente Pegado, captain of the Portuguese garrison of Sofala on the coast of modern-day Mozambique, who recorded it as Symbaoe. The first confirmed visits by Europeans were in the late 19th century, with investigations of the site starting in 1871. Some later studies of the monument were controversial, as the white government of Rhodesia pressured archaeologists to deny its construction by black Africans. Great Zimbabwe has since been adopted as a national monument by the Zimbabwean government, and the modern independent state was named after it. 

The word great distinguishes the site from the many smaller ruins, now known as "zimbabwes", spread across the Zimbabwe Highveld. There are 200 such sites in southern Africa, such as Bumbusi in Zimbabwe and Manyikeni in Mozambique, with monumental, mortarless walls.

Name

Zimbabwe is the Shona name of the ruins, first recorded in 1531 by Vicente Pegado, captain of the Portuguese garrison of Sofala. Pegado noted that "The natives of the country call these edifices Symbaoe, which according to their language signifies 'court.

The name contains , the Shona term for "houses". There are two theories for the etymology of the name.

Description

Settlement
The majority of scholars believe that it was built by members of the Gokomere culture, who were the ancestors of the modern Shona in Zimbabwe.

The Great Zimbabwe area was settled by the 4th century AD. Between the 4th and the 7th centuries, communities of the Gokomere or Ziwa cultures farmed the valley, and mined and worked iron, but built no stone structures. These are the earliest Iron Age settlements in the area identified from archaeological diggings.

Construction and growth
Construction of the stone buildings started in the 11th century and continued for over 300 years. The ruins at Great Zimbabwe are some of the oldest and largest structures located in Southern Africa, and are the second oldest after nearby Mapungubwe in South Africa. David Beach believes that the city and its proposed state, the Kingdom of Zimbabwe, flourished from 1200 to 1500, although a somewhat earlier date for its demise is implied by a description transmitted in the early 1500s to João de Barros. Its growth has been linked to the decline of Mapungubwe from around 1300, due to climatic change or the greater availability of gold in the hinterland of Great Zimbabwe. 

Traditional estimates are that Great Zimbabwe had as many as 18,000 inhabitants at its peak. However, a more recent survey concluded that the population likely never exceeded 10,000. The ruins that survive are built entirely of stone; they span .

Features of the ruins

In 1531, Vicente Pegado, Captain of the Portuguese Garrison of Sofala, described Zimbabwe thus:

The ruins form three distinct architectural groups. They are known as the Hill Complex, the Valley Complex and the Great Enclosure. The Hill Complex is the oldest, and was occupied from the 9th to 13th centuries. The Great Enclosure was occupied from the 13th to 15th centuries, and the Valley Complex from the 14th to 16th centuries. Notable features of the Hill Complex include the Eastern Enclosure, in which it is thought the Zimbabwe Birds stood, a high balcony enclosure overlooking the Eastern Enclosure, and a huge boulder in a shape similar to that of the Zimbabwe Bird. The Great Enclosure is composed of an inner wall, encircling a series of structures and a younger outer wall. The Valley Complex is divided into the Upper and Lower Valley Ruins, with different periods of occupation.

There are different archaeological interpretations of these groupings. It has been suggested that the complexes represent the work of successive kings: some of the new rulers founded a new residence. The focus of power moved from the Hill Complex in the 12th century, to the Great Enclosure, the Upper Valley and finally the Lower Valley in the early 16th century. The alternative "structuralist" interpretation holds that the different complexes had different functions: the Hill Complex as an area for rituals, perhaps related to rain making, the Valley complex was for the citizens, and the Great Enclosure was used by the king. Structures that were more elaborate were probably built for the kings, although it has been argued that the dating of finds in the complexes does not support this interpretation.

Notable artefacts

The most important artefacts recovered from the Monument are the eight Zimbabwe Birds. These were carved from a micaceous schist (soapstone) on the tops of monoliths the height of a person. Slots in a platform in the Eastern Enclosure of the Hill Complex appear designed to hold the monoliths with the Zimbabwe birds, but as they were not found in situ it cannot be determined which monolith and bird were where. Other artefacts include soapstone figurines (one of which is in the British Museum), pottery, iron gongs, elaborately worked ivory, iron and copper wire, iron hoes, bronze spearheads, copper ingots and crucibles, and gold beads, bracelets, pendants and sheaths. Glass beads and porcelain from China and Persia among other foreign artefacts were also found, attesting the international trade linkages of the Kingdom. In the extensive stone ruins of the great city, which still remain today, include eight, monolithic birds carved in soapstone. It is thought that they represent the bateleur eagle – a good omen, protective spirit and messenger of the gods in Shona culture.

Trade

Archaeological evidence suggests that Great Zimbabwe became a centre for trading, with artefacts suggesting that the city formed part of a trade network linked to Kilwa and extending as far as China. Copper coins found at Kilwa Kisiwani appear to be of the same pure ore found on the Swahili coast. This international trade was mainly in gold and ivory; some estimates indicate that more than 20 million ounces of gold were extracted from the ground. That international commerce was in addition to the local agricultural trade, in which cattle were especially important. The large cattle herd that supplied the city moved seasonally and was managed by the court. Chinese pottery shards, coins from Arabia, glass beads and other non-local items have been excavated at Zimbabwe. Despite these strong international trade links, there is no evidence to suggest exchange of architectural concepts between Great Zimbabwe and centres such as Kilwa.

Decline
The causes for the decline and ultimate abandonment of the site around 1450 have been suggested as due to a decline in trade compared to sites further north, the exhaustion of the gold mines, political instability and famine and water shortages induced by climatic change. The Mutapa state arose in the 15th century from the northward expansion of the Great Zimbabwe tradition, having been founded by Nyatsimba Mutota from Great Zimbabwe after he was sent to find new sources of salt in the north; (this supports the belief that Great Zimbabwe's decline was due to a shortage of resources). Great Zimbabwe also predates the Khami and Nyanga cultures.

History of research and origins of the ruins

From Portuguese traders to Karl Mauch
The first European visit may have been made by the Portuguese traveler António Fernandes in 1513–1515, who crossed twice and reported in detail the region of present-day Zimbabwe (including the Shona kingdoms) and also fortified centers in stone without mortar. Portuguese traders heard about the remains of the medieval city in the early 16th century, and records survive of interviews and notes made by some of them, linking Great Zimbabwe to gold production and long-distance trade. Two of those accounts mention an inscription above the entrance to Great Zimbabwe, written in characters not known to the Arab merchants who had seen it.

In 1506, the explorer Diogo de Alcáçova described the edifices in a letter to the then King of Portugal, writing that they were part of the larger kingdom of Ucalanga (presumably Karanga, a dialect of the Shona people spoken mainly in Masvingo and Midlands provinces of Zimbabwe). João de Barros left another such description of Great Zimbabwe in 1538, as recounted to him by Moorish traders who had visited the area and possessed knowledge of the hinterland. He indicates that the edifices were locally known as Symbaoe, which meant "royal court" in the vernacular. As to the actual identity of the builders of Great Zimbabwe, de Barros writes:

Additionally, with regard to the purpose of the Great Zimbabwe ruins, de Barros asserted that: "in the opinion of the Moors who saw it [Great Zimbabwe] it is very ancient and was built to keep possessions of the mines, which are very old, and no gold has been extracted from them for years, because of the wars ... it would seem that some prince who has possession of these mines ordered it to be built as a sign thereof, which he afterwards lost in the course of time and through their being so remote from his kingdom".

De Barros further remarked that Symbaoe "is guarded by a nobleman, who has charge of it, after the manner of a chief alcaide, and they call this officer Symbacayo ... and there are always some of Benomotapa's wives therein of whom Symbacayo takes care." Thus, Great Zimbabwe appears to have still been inhabited as recently as the early 16th century.

Karl Mauch and the Queen of Sheba
The ruins were rediscovered during a hunting trip in 1867 by Adam Render, a German-American hunter, prospector and trader in southern Africa, who in 1871 showed the ruins to Karl Mauch, a German explorer and geographer of Africa. Karl Mauch recorded the ruins 3 September 1871, and immediately speculated about a possible Biblical association with King Solomon and the Queen of Sheba, an explanation which had been suggested by earlier writers such as the Portuguese João dos Santos. Mauch went so far as to favour a legend that the structures were built to replicate the palace of the Queen of Sheba in Jerusalem, and claimed a wooden lintel at the site must be Lebanese cedar, brought by Phoenicians. The Sheba legend, as promoted by Mauch, became so pervasive in the white settler community as to cause the later scholar James Theodore Bent to say,

Carl Peters and Theodore Bent

Carl Peters collected a ceramic ushabti in 1905. Flinders Petrie examined it and identified a cartouche on its chest as belonging to the 18th Dynasty Egyptian Pharaoh Thutmose III and suggested that it was a statuette of the king and cited it as proof of commercial ties between rulers in the area and the ancient Egyptians during the New Kingdom (c. 1550–1077 BC), if not a relic of an old Egyptian station near the local gold mines. Johann Heinrich Schäfer later appraised the statuette, and argued that it belonged to a well-known group of forgeries. After having received the ushabti, Felix von Luschan suggested that it was of more recent origin than the New Kingdom. He asserted that the figurine instead appeared to date to the subsequent Ptolemaic era (c. 323–30 BC), when Alexandria-based Greek merchants would export Egyptian antiquities and pseudo-antiquities to southern Africa.

J. Theodore Bent undertook a season at Zimbabwe with Cecil Rhodes's patronage and funding from the Royal Geographical Society and the British Association for the Advancement of Science.  This, and other excavations undertaken for Rhodes, resulted in a book publication that introduced the ruins to English readers. Bent had no formal archaeological training, but had travelled very widely in Arabia, Greece and Asia Minor. He was aided by the expert cartographer and surveyor Robert M. W. Swan (1858–1904), who also visited and surveyed a host of related stone ruins nearby.  Bent stated in the first edition of his book The Ruined Cities of Mashonaland (1892) that the ruins revealed either the Phoenicians or the Arabs as builders, and he favoured the possibility of great antiquity for the fortress. By the third edition of his book (1902) he was more specific, with his primary theory being "a Semitic race and of Arabian origin" of "strongly commercial" traders living within a client African city.

The Lemba

The construction of Great Zimbabwe is also claimed by the Lemba. Members of this ethnic group speak the Bantu languages spoken by their geographic neighbours and resemble them physically, but they have some religious practices and beliefs similar to those in Judaism and Islam, which they claim were transmitted by oral tradition. They have a tradition of ancient Jewish or South Arabian descent through their male line. Genetic Y-DNA analyses in the 2000s have established a partially Middle-Eastern origin for a portion of the male Lemba population. More recent research argues that DNA studies do not support claims for a specifically Jewish genetic heritage.

The Lemba claim was also reported by a William Bolts (in 1777, to the Austrian Habsburg authorities), and by an A.A. Anderson (writing about his travels north of the Limpopo River in the 19th century). Both explorers were told that the stone edifices and the gold mines were constructed by a people known as the BaLemba.

However, archaeological evidence and recent scholarship support the construction of Great Zimbabwe (and the origin of its culture) by the Shona and Venda peoples.

David Randall-MacIver and medieval origin
The first scientific archaeological excavations at the site were undertaken by David Randall-MacIver for the British Association in 1905–1906. In Medieval Rhodesia, he rejected the claims made by Adam Render, Carl Peters and Karl Mauch, and instead wrote of the existence in the site of objects that were of Bantu origin. Randall-MacIver concluded that all available evidence led him to believe that the Zimbabwe structures were constructed by the ancestors of the Shona people. More importantly he suggested a wholly medieval date for the walled fortifications and temple.  This claim was not immediately accepted, partly due to the relatively short and undermanned period of excavation he was able to undertake.

Gertrude Caton Thompson

In mid-1929 Gertrude Caton Thompson concluded, after a twelve-day visit of a three-person team and the digging of several trenches, that the site was indeed created by Bantu. She had first sunk three test pits into what had been refuse heaps on the upper terraces of the hill complex, producing a mix of unremarkable pottery and ironwork. She then moved to the Conical Tower and tried to dig under the tower, arguing that the ground there would be undisturbed, but nothing was revealed. Some further test trenches were then put down outside the lower Great Enclosure and in the Valley Ruins, which unearthed domestic ironwork, glass beads, and a gold bracelet. Caton Thompson immediately announced her Bantu origin theory to a meeting of the British Association in Johannesburg. Caton Thompson's claim was not immediately favoured, although it had strong support among some scientific archaeologists due to her modern methods. Her most important contribution was in helping to confirm the theory of a medieval origin for the masonry work of the 14th and 15th centuries. By 1931, she had modified her Bantu theory somewhat, allowing for a possible Arabian influence for the towers through the imitation of buildings or art seen at coastal Arabian trading cities.

Post-1945 research

Since the 1950s, there has been consensus among archaeologists as to the African origins of Great Zimbabwe. Artefacts and radiocarbon dating indicate settlement in at least the 5th century, with continuous settlement of Great Zimbabwe between the 12th and 15th centuries and the bulk of the finds from the 15th century. The radiocarbon evidence is a suite of 28 measurements, for which all but the first four, from the early days of the use of that method and now viewed as inaccurate, support the 12th-to-15th-centuries chronology. In the 1970s, a beam that produced some of the anomalous dates in 1952 was reanalysed and gave a 14th-century date. Dated finds such as Chinese, Persian and Syrian artefacts also support the 12th- and 15th-century dates.

Gokomere
Archaeologists generally agree that the builders probably spoke one of the Shona languages, based upon evidence of pottery, oral traditions and anthropology and were probably descended from the Gokomere culture. The Gokomere culture, an eastern Bantu subgroup, existed in the area from around 200 AD and flourished from 500 AD to about 800 AD. Archaeological evidence indicates that it constitutes an early phase of the Great Zimbabwe culture. The Gokomere culture likely gave rise to both the modern Mashona people, an ethnic cluster comprising distinct sub-ethnic groups such as the local Karanga clan and the Rozwi culture, which originated as several Shona states. Gokomere peoples were probably also related to certain nearby early Bantu groups like the Mapungubwe civilisation of neighbouring North eastern South Africa, which is believed to have been an early Venda-speaking culture, and to the nearby Sotho.

Recent research

More recent archaeological work has been carried out by Peter Garlake, who has produced the comprehensive descriptions of the site, David Beach and Thomas Huffman, who have worked on the chronology and development of Great Zimbabwe and Gilbert Pwiti, who has published extensively on trade links. Today, the most recent consensus appears to attribute the construction of Great Zimbabwe to the Shona people. Some evidence also suggests an early influence from the probably Venda-speaking peoples of the Mapungubwe civilization.

Damage to the ruins

Damage to the ruins has taken place throughout the last century. The removal of gold and artefacts in amateurist diggings by early colonial antiquarians caused widespread damage, notably diggings by Richard Nicklin Hall. More extensive damage was caused by the mining of some of the ruins for gold. Reconstruction attempts since 1980 caused further damage, leading to alienation of the local communities from the site. Another source of damage to the ruins has been due to the site being open to visitors with many cases of people climbing the walls, walking over archaeological deposits, and the over-use of certain paths all have had major impacts on the structures at the site. These are in conjunction with damages due to the natural weathering that occurs over time due to vegetation growth, the foundations settling, and erosion from the weather.

Political implications

Martin Hall writes that the history of Iron Age research south of the Zambezi shows the prevalent influence of colonial ideologies, both in the earliest speculations about the nature of the African past and in the adaptations that have been made to contemporary archaeological methodologies. Preben Kaarsholm writes that both colonial and black nationalist groups invoked Great Zimbabwe's past to support their vision of the country's present, through the media of popular history and of fiction. Examples of such popular history include Alexander Wilmot's Monomotapa (Rhodesia) and Ken Mufuka's Dzimbahwe: Life and Politics in the Golden Age; examples from fiction include Wilbur Smith's The Sunbird and Stanlake Samkange's Year of the Uprising.

When white colonialists like Cecil Rhodes first saw the ruins, they saw them as a sign of the great riches that the area would yield to its new masters. Pikirayi and Kaarsholm suggest that this presentation of Great Zimbabwe was partly intended to encourage settlement and investment in the area. Gertrude Caton-Thompson recognised that the builders were indigenous Africans, but she characterised the site as the "product of an infantile mind" built by a subjugated society. The official line in Rhodesia during the 1960s and 1970s was that the structures were built by non-blacks. Archaeologists who disputed the official statement were censored by the government. According to Paul Sinclair, interviewed for None But Ourselves:

This suppression of archaeology culminated in the departure from the country of prominent archaeologists of Great Zimbabwe, including Peter Garlake, Senior Inspector of Monuments for Rhodesia, and Roger Summers of the National Museum.

To black nationalist groups, Great Zimbabwe became an important symbol of achievement by Africans: reclaiming its history was a major aim for those seeking majority rule. In 1980 the new internationally recognised independent country was renamed for the site, and its famous soapstone bird carvings were retained from the Rhodesian flag and Coat of Arms as a national symbol and depicted in the new Zimbabwean flag. After the creation of the modern state of Zimbabwe in 1980, Great Zimbabwe has been employed to mirror and legitimise shifting policies of the ruling regime. At first it was argued that it represented a form of pre-colonial "African socialism" and later the focus shifted to stressing the natural evolution of an accumulation of wealth and power within a ruling elite. An example of the former is Ken Mufuka's booklet, although the work has been heavily criticised. A tower of the Great Zimbabwe is also depicted on the coat of arms of Zimbabwe.

Some of the carvings had been taken from Great Zimbabwe around 1890 and sold to Cecil Rhodes, who was intrigued and had copies made which he gave to friends. Most of the carvings have now been returned to Zimbabwe, but one remains at Rhodes' old home, Groote Schuur, in Cape Town.

The Great Zimbabwe University

In the early 21st century, the government of Zimbabwe endorsed the creation of a university in the vicinity of the ruins. This university is an arts and culture based university which draws from the rich history of the monuments. The university main site is near the monuments with other campuses in the City centre and Mashava. The campuses include Herbet Chitepo Law School, Robert Mugabe School of Education, Gary Magadzire School of Agriculture and Natural Science, Simon Muzenda School of Arts, and Munhumutapa School of Commerce.

Gallery

See also 
Other ruins in Zimbabwe
Bumbusi
Danangombe
Naletale
Khami
Ziwa
Leopard's Kopje
Related ruins outside Zimbabwe
Manyikeni – a Mozambiquean archaeological site believed to be part of the Great Zimbabwe tradition of architecture
Similar ruins outside Zimbabwe
Blaauboschkraal stone ruins in Mpumalanga, South Africa
Machadodorp baKoni Ruins in Mpumalanga, South Africa
Engaruka in Arusha Region, Tanzania
Kweneng' Ruins in Gauteng, South Africa
Mapungubwe in Limpopo, South Africa
Thimlich Ohinga stone ruins in Migori County, Kenya
Megaliths

Notes

Sources

External links

 Great Zimbabwe Ruins
Great Zimbabwe entry on the UNESCO World Heritage site

1870s in Zimbabwe
African architecture
Archaeological sites in Zimbabwe
Buildings and structures completed in the 11th century
Buildings and structures in Masvingo Province
Zimbabwe
Geography of Masvingo Province
History of Zimbabwe
Masvingo
Prehistoric Africa
Ruins in Zimbabwe
Tourist attractions in Masvingo Province
Tourist attractions in Zimbabwe
World Heritage Sites in Zimbabwe
Archaeological history of Eastern Africa
Archaeology of Eastern Africa
Archaeological sites of Eastern Africa
Nationalism and archaeology
Archaeology and racism